1,2-DCE may refer to:

 1,2-Dichloroethane (EDC)
 1,2-Dichloroethene